Socialis may refer to:

Blechnum sociale, a species of fern in the family Blechnaceae sometimes incorrectly known as Blechnum socialis
Drapetisca socialis, a species of spider belonging to the family Linyphiidae
Ledebouria socialis, a species of bulbous perennial plant in the family Asparagaceae
Microtus socialis, a species of rodent in the family Cricetidae
Pluvianellus socialis, a rare and unique wader
Sollicitudo rei socialis, an encyclical written by Pope John Paul II on 30 December 1987
Styrax pentlandianus, synonym Styrax socialis, a species of flowering plant in the family Styracaceae